Yonfrez Antonio Parejo (born August 1, 1986) is a Venezuelan professional boxer.

World title
Parejo won the World Boxing Association interim bantamweight world title by defeating Luis Hinojosa. He had previously lost an attempt for that title to Hugo Ruiz. He lost in his first defense to Zhanat Zhakiyanov by split decision. Parejo would eventually get a shot at the full title when he fought WBA super champion Ryan Burnett, he would lose via unanimous decision.

Professional boxing record

See also
List of bantamweight boxing champions

References

External links

1986 births
Living people
Venezuelan male boxers
Sportspeople from Valencia, Venezuela
Bantamweight boxers
Super-bantamweight boxers
World bantamweight boxing champions
World Boxing Association champions